During the Edo period of Japanese history,  were self-governing administrative units, led by the .

Description 
The development of mura reflected specific changes that show the transition of the Edo community from medieval agricultural to mature administrative unit. Villages were also manufacturing units: In western Japan, cottage industries developed, with each family of the village taking over a one step of the production process.

Villages were taxed as a unit, with the village headman responsible for taxation. Taxes were paid in rice, often 40 to 50% of the harvest. Criminal punishments could also be imposed on the village as a unit.

Prior to the emergence of religious authorities such as the Buddhist establishment, mura - along with the family (ie) - helped establish Japanese cultural practices such as ancestral veneration and funerary rites. Some of the villages served as enclaves or base-villages for the miko or female shamans.

References 

Edo period
Villages in Japan
Economy of feudal Japan